John 20:30 is the thirtieth verse of the twentieth chapter of the Gospel of John in the New Testament. It contains the statement of purpose for the whole gospel.

Content
The text in Koine Greek, according to the Textus Receptus, reads:

In the King James Version of the Bible it is translated as:
And many other signs truly did Jesus in the presence of his disciples, which are not written in this book:

The modern World English Bible translates the passage as:
Therefore Jesus did many other signs in the presence of his disciples, which are not written in this book;

For a collection of other versions see BibleHub John 20:30

Analysis
This verse and the following form a first epilogue of what he calls "this book". The record in this gospel is clearly selective for leading to a specific kind of faith in Jesus. Udo Schnelle notes that "the book" form provides 'the accountability and the dependability of what had happened'

These two verses are linked to what precedes with the particles men oun ("therefore"), such that 'those who have not seen the risen Christ and yet believed are blessed; therefore this book has been composed, to the end that you may believe'. The particle men is then paired with 'de' in verse 31 to frame the idea from the two verses, such that on the one hand many more signs of Jesus could not be reported, but on the other 'these have been committed to writing so that you may believe'.

The word 'sign' becomes the key to understand the risen Christ's appearances and their link with the 'signs' witnessed during Christ's public life. Schnelle notes "if the pre-Easter Jesus was able sēmeia poiein ("to do signs"), so after Easter these deeds can only be proclaimed and experienced as sēmeia gegrammens ("written signs")".

References

Sources

External links
Jesus Appears to His Disciples

20:30
John 20:30